Roger Scott (born October 14, 1956) is an American football and baseball coach.

Playing career
Scott played football at Carthage College located in Kenosha, Wisconsin while pursuing his undergraduate degree.

Coaching career

University of Chicago
Scott was the coach of the baseball team and assistant coach of the football team at the University of Chicago from 1983 until 1985.

Carthage
Scott next became the head football coach for his alma mater at Carthage.  He held that position for three seasons, from 1985  to 1987, compiling a record of 6–21.

Head coaching record

Football

References

1956 births
Living people
Carthage Firebirds football coaches
Carthage Firebirds football players
Chicago Maroons baseball coaches
Chicago Maroons football coaches